Umm al-Qasab (also spelled Umm al-Kasab) is a village in northern Syria located northwest of Homs in the Homs Governorate. According to the Syria Central Bureau of Statistics, Umm al-Qasab had a population of 904 in the 2004 census. Its inhabitants are predominantly Turkmens.

References

Populated places in Homs District
Turkmen communities in Syria